The 2021–22 Northern Kentucky Norse men's basketball team represented Northern Kentucky University in the 2021–22 NCAA Division I men's basketball season. The Norse, led by third-year head coach Darrin Horn, played their home games at BB&T Arena in Highland Heights, Kentucky as members of the Horizon League.

This was the final season in which the Norse's home was known as BB&T Arena. In 2020, the arena's sponsor BB&T merged with SunTrust to create Truist Financial. However, the merged company did not start branding its Kentucky locations with the new corporate name until late 2021. On April 5, 2022, the venue was officially renamed Truist Arena.

Previous season
The Norse finished the 2020–21 season 14–11, 11–7 in Horizon League play to finish in fourth place. In the Horizon League tournament, they defeated Detroit Mercy in quarterfinals, before losing to Oakland in the semifinals.

Roster

Schedule and results

|-
!colspan=12 style=| Exhibition

|-
!colspan=12 style=| Regular season

|-
!colspan=9 style=| Horizon League tournament

Source

References

Northern Kentucky Norse men's basketball seasons
Northern Kentucky
Northern Kentucky Norse men's basketball
Northern Kentucky Norse men's basketball